The Desert Hawk is a 1924 American silent Western film directed by Leon De La Mothe and starring Ben F. Wilson, Mildred Harris and Louise Lester. It was released by the independent company Arrow Pictures.

Synopsis
Hawk Hollister, wrongly wanted for killing the sheriff's brother, comes to the aid of Marie Nicholls when she encounters a gang trying to steal the inheritance left to her by her uncle.

Cast
 Ben F. Wilson as Hawk Hollister 
 Mildred Harris as Marie Nicholls
 William Bailey asTex Trapp
 Louise Lester as Bridget
 Yakima Canutt as Handy Man
 Ed La Niece as Sheriff Carson
 Leon De La Mothe as Sheriff Jackson
 Helen Broneau as Mercedes Nicholls

References

Bibliography
 Connelly, Robert B. The Silents: Silent Feature Films, 1910-36, Volume 40, Issue 2. December Press, 1998.
 Munden, Kenneth White. The American Film Institute Catalog of Motion Pictures Produced in the United States, Part 1. University of California Press, 1997.

External links
 

1924 films
1924 Western (genre) films
1920s English-language films
American silent feature films
Silent American Western (genre) films
American black-and-white films
Films directed by Leon De La Mothe
Arrow Film Corporation films
1920s American films